Rap Is FrancisM is Francis Magalona's second album, released in early 1992 by OctoArts International Inc. (now PolyEast Records).

It features a remake of "Tayo'y Mga Pinoy," an original by Heber Bartolome of Banyuhay, as well as the hits "Man from Manila," was released in 1991. "Mga Praning" (a song about drug addicts and drug addiction), and "Halalan," a song specifically written for the 1992 national elections.

Track listing

References

1992 albums
Francis Magalona albums